Berliner Morgenpost is a German newspaper, based and mainly read in Berlin, where it is the second most read daily newspaper.

History and profile
Founded in 1898 by Leopold Ullstein, the paper was taken over by Axel Springer AG in 1959. It was sold to Funke Mediengruppe in 2013. The paper had a circulation of 145,556 issues in 2009, with an estimated 322,000 readers The current editor-in-chief is Carsten Erdmann.

It was awarded the European Newspaper of the Year in the category of regional newspaper by the European Newspapers Congress in 2012.

Editor-in-chiefs 
 1952–1953	Wilhelm Schulze
 1953–1959	Helmut Meyer-Dietrich
 1960–1972	Heinz Köster
 1973–1976	Walter Brückmann
 1976–1978	Werner Marquardt
 1978–1981	Wolfgang Kryszohn
 1981–1987	Johannes Otto
 1988–1996	Bruno Waltert
 1996–1999	Peter Philipps
 1999–2002	Herbert Wessels
 2002	Wolfram Weimer
 2003–2004	Jan-Eric Peters
 2004–2018	Carsten Erdmann
 since 2018 Christine Richter

References

External links
  

1898 establishments in Germany
Daily newspapers published in Germany
German-language newspapers
German news websites
Newspapers published in Berlin
Publications established in 1898